Engender is an anti-sexist organisation operating in Scotland and other parts of Europe. They aim "to make Scotland a fairer, safer place where women can flourish and contribute to both the social and market economies with dignity, freedom and justice." Engender's goals include increased public awareness of sexism and its detrimental effects on society, equal representation of women in government, and training women activists at the local level.

Engender was founded in the early 1990s as a research and campaigning organisation. They are based in Edinburgh.
Fundings for Engender are received from various organizations but their main grant funder is the Scottish Government Equality Fund. Engender's website includes different policy focuses within the site such as abortion, social security, women's rights, and disabled women. These tabs are there to raise awareness on the issues as well as inform the readers.

Engender unequivocally supports the decriminalization of abortion and believes that the Scottish government should improve access, support and services around reproductive rights. "Women's and equalities organizations are very concerned about plans to pay Universal Credit to households, not individuals, which undermine women's financial independence, safety and equality."

References

External links
Official website

Charities based in Edinburgh
Women's organisations based in Scotland
Feminist organisations in Scotland
1990s establishments in Scotland
Organizations established in the 1990s
Research organisations in Scotland